The Loft may refer to:

Arts, entertainment, and media
 The Loft (British band), a British indie band
 The Loft (Danish band), a Danish band
 The Loft (film) (2014) an American film
 The Loft (Sirius XM), a music channel on satellite radio
 The Loft Literary Center, a nonprofit literary organization in Minneapolis, Minnesota

Buildings and venues
 The Loft (New York City), a nightclub in New York City
 The Loft, the upstairs concert hall of The Chance concert and theater complex, Poughkeepsie, New York
 The Loft 2, residential skyscrapers in Miami